Brenda Hiatt is an American, New York Times and USA Today bestselling author of romantic adventure novels, including traditional Regency romance, time travel romance, historical novels, contemporary humorous mystery, and most recently young adult science fiction romance.  She has authored and published over 20 such novels in a writing career that started in 1988.

Biography 
Born in Washington, D.C., Hiatt graduated from the College of William and Mary, in Williamsburg, VA, with degrees in biology and psychology in 1978, before attending graduate school at Texas A&M University 1979–81. She has since lived in Hawaii, South Carolina, Texas, Indiana and now Key Largo, FL.  She is married and has two children.

Early career 
On starting her career, Hiatt declared,  "I began writing in 1988, an army wife at home with two preschool children. I promised myself that, if nothing sold before my youngest began school, I'd get a 'real job,' so I was thrilled to sell a Regency romance novel to Harlequin six months ahead of that deadline."

Writing career 
To date, Hiatt's published novels include six Harlequin Regency Romances, one Harlequin Superromance, two single title historical romances with HarperCollins, six historical romances with Avon Books, and a self-published six book young adult science fiction romance series. Hiatt's first single title historical romance, Scandalous Virtue, was named Best Romance Novel of 1999 by the American Book Readers Association and, like many of her books, is of the Regency Romance genre.  Her one time travel romance, Bridge Over Time, presents an unusual spin in the time travel genre as it features two heroines who trade places in time and gives equal time to both.    Her works include a six book Regency Historical Romance series featuring "the Saint of Seven Dials," a series of successive rogue heroes who victimize the rich to help impoverished residents in London's notorious Seven Dials slum.

In September 2013, she released  Starstruck, her first teen science fiction themed novel that is the first of a four-book series. The second book in the series, Starcrossed, was released in late January 2014.  Book 3 in the series, Starbound, was released in June 2014 with Book 4, Starfall, released in February 2015 as the conclusion to the series.  Successful sales of the series and demand from readers for more of it promptedher to release Fractured Jewel, A Starstruck Novella in July 2016. In June 2017 Hiatt released The Girl From Mars featuring a new heroine who despises and challenges the longstanding heroine, Marsha. In October 2018 she released another Starstruck novel, The Handmaid's Secret, focusing on Marsha's close friend Molly.  Brenda has indicated that she plans more books in the Starstruck series.

Starstruck has won numerous awards including first place in the  National Excellence in Romance Fiction Award, first place in the I Heart Indie Contest, first place  Book Buyers Best Contest, first place in the International Digital Awards, and second place in the Ancient City Romance Authors Readers Choice Award in the young adult category for each contest.  In March 2015 Hiatt released Rigel's Jewel, an eShort retelling the first few chapters of Starstruck from the hero's perspective and made available for free to subscribers to her newsletter.

In January 2014, Hiatt was one of four authors of Scandalous Brides, an ebook "box set" compilation of four full length Regency Romance novels, with Hiatt's earlier published work, Scandalous Virtue, being her contribution.  Scandalous Brides premiered at #12 on the USA Today bestsellers list.  It then also reached #4 on the New York Times combined fiction print and ebook sales bestseller list.

In April 2015, Hiatt released her first three published books, Gabriella, The Cygnet and Lord Dearborn's Destiny, as an ebook compilation entitled Hiatt Regency Classics 1, 2 & 3.  On April 23, 2015 the ebook reached  #133 on the USA Today Bestsellers List. This compilation was followed in December 2015 with Hiatt Regency Classics 4, 5, & 6 consisting of Daring Deception, Christmas Bride and Azalea.

In February 2016, Hiatt returned to her Saint of Seven Seven Dials books, after a thirteen-year hiatus in the series, with the publication of Gallant Scoundrel.

Starting in 2017 Hiatt has released German and Italian translations of many of her books, which have enjoyed significant success in those countries.

An active member of Romance Writers of America since 1990, Hiatt has also served as President of Novelists, Inc, an international organization of over 800 multi-published novelists. She also teaches an online writing seminar.

Philanthropy
Hiatt has been an active member of the Romance Writers of America, a national non-profit genre writers association that provides networking and support to individuals seriously pursuing a career in romance fiction, since 1990.  She participates every year in the organization's Readers for Life Literacy Autographing, which has raised more than $300,000 for adult literacy.

Awards and honors
In 1999, Hiatt won the American Book Readers Association Award for best romance novel for the book Scandalous Virtue.

Titles
 The Handmaid's Secret, the seventh story in the Starstruck Series – Dolphin Star Press, October 2018.
 The Girl From Mars, the sixth story in the Starstruck Series – Dolphin Star Press, June 2017.
 Christmas Promises, a prequel to A Christmas Bride – Dolphin Star Press, December 2016.
 Fractured Jewel, A Starstruck Novella – Dolphin Star Press, July 2016.  
 Gallant Scoundrel – Dolphin Star Press, February, 2016.
 Hiatt Regency Classics 4, 5, & 6 – Dolphin Star Press, December, 2015
 Hiatt Regency Classics 1, 2 & 3 – Dolphin Star Press, April, 2015
 Starfall – Dolphin Star Press, February, 2015 
 Regency Masquerades−Dolphin Star Press, October 2014
 Starbound – Dolphin Star Press, June 2014 
 Starcrossed – Dolphin Star Press, January 2014
 Scandalous Brides – Sprigleaf, January 2014
 Starstruck – Dolphin Star Press, September, 2013
 Out of Her Depth – Bell Bridge Books, March 2013
The Runaway Heiress – Avon, June 2005
Taming Tessa (later independently published as Tessa's Touch) – Avon, September 2004
Wickedly Yours (later independently published as Saintly Sins) – Avon, November 2003
Innocent Passions – Avon, February 2003
A Rebellious Bride (later independently published as Noble Deceptions) – Avon, April 2002
Rogue's Honor – Avon, July 2001
Ship Of Dreams – HarperCollins, April 2000
Scandalous Virtue – HarperCollins, June 1999
Azalea – Harlequin "Regency Diamonds," August 1994
Bridge Over Time – Harlequin Superromance, April 1994
A Christmas Bride – Harlequin Regency, December 1993
Daring Deception – Harlequin Regency, July 1993
Lord Dearborn's Destiny – Harlequin Regency, February 1993
The Ugly Duckling(later independently published as The Cygnet)—Harlequin Regency, September 1992
Gabriella – Harlequin Regency, March 1992

References

External links
 Brenda Hiatt's website

Year of birth missing (living people)
Living people
20th-century American novelists
21st-century American novelists
American romantic fiction writers
College of William & Mary alumni
Texas A&M University alumni
People from Virginia
Novelists from Indiana
American women novelists
Women romantic fiction writers
21st-century American women writers